Elusa is a genus of moths of the family Noctuidae erected by Francis Walker in 1859.

Description
Its eyes are naked and without lashes. The proboscis is well developed. Palpi obliquely upturned, where the second joint reaching vertex of head and roughly scaled. Third joint is short. Antennae of male bipectinated, where branches bent round and almost forming a cylinder just before the middle, where the shaft is contorted and the branches form a large hollow cup, after which they gradually diminish to apex. Thorax tuftless. Abdomen with dorsal tufts. Legs with dense hairy tibia. Hindlegs are clothed with very long hair to the end of tarsi. Forewings with non-crenulate cilia, where the inner margin lobed at base. There are long scaly tufts at outer angle.

Species
 Elusa affinis Rothschild, 1915
 Elusa alector Wileman & West, 1928
 Elusa antennata (Moore, 1882)
 Elusa binocula Hampson, 1911
 Elusa ceneusalis Walker, [1859]
 Elusa confusa Warren, 1913
 Elusa cyathicornis (Walker, 1862)
 Elusa diloba Hampson, 1909
 Elusa dinawa Bethune-Baker, 1906
 Elusa duplicata Warren, 1913
 Elusa flammans Warren, 1913
 Elusa ignea Warren, 1913
 Elusa incertans Bethune-Baker, 1906
 Elusa inventa Berio, 1977
 Elusa mediorufa Hampson, 1909
 Elusa oenolopha Turner, 1902
 Elusa orion Roepke, 1956
 Elusa penanorum Holloway, 1989
 Elusa peninsulata (Walker, 1865)
 Elusa pratti Bethune-Baker, 1906
 Elusa puncticeps (Walker, 1863)
 Elusa purpurea Warren, 1913
 Elusa pyrrhobaphes (Turner, 1943)
 Elusa semipecten C. Swinhoe, 1901
 Elusa simplex Warren, 1913
 Elusa subjecta (Walker, 1865)
 Elusa temburong Holloway, 1989
 Elusa ustula Hampson, 1909

References

Hadeninae
Noctuoidea genera